Adenanthera intermedia is a species of plant in the family Fabaceae. It is found only in the Philippines. It is threatened by habitat loss.

References

intermedia
Flora of the Philippines
Vulnerable plants
Taxonomy articles created by Polbot